Mortimer Taube (December 6, 1910 – September 3, 1965) was an American librarian. He is on the list of the 100 most important leaders in Library and Information Science of the 20th century.  He was important to the Library Science field because he invented Coordinate Indexing, which uses "uniterms" in the context of cataloging. It is the forerunner to computer based searches. In the early 1950s he started his own company, Documentation, Inc. with Gerald J. Sophar. Previously he worked at such institutions as the Library of Congress, the Department of Defense, and the Atomic Energy Commission. American Libraries calls him "an innovator and inventor, as well as scholar and savvy businessman."   Current Biography called him the "Dewey of mid-twentieth Librarianship."  Mortimer Taube was a very active man with varying interests such as tennis, philosophy, sailing, music, and collecting paintings.

Education and early career
Mortimer Taube was born in Jersey City, New Jersey on December 6, 1910. Taube received his Bachelor of Arts in Philosophy from the University of Chicago in 1933. He then pursued a Ph.D. in the same field from the University of California at Berkeley in 1935. The following year, 1936, he received a certificate in librarianship from Berkeley. For some time after this, he worked at various libraries and was a lecturer at Mills College, Harvard University, Duke University, University of Chicago, and Columbia University.

Innovation after the war
In 1944, Mortimer Taube left academia behind to become a true innovator in the field of science, especially Information Science.  After the war, there was a huge boom of scientific invention, and the literature to go with it. The contemporary indexing and retrieval methods simply could not handle the inflow. New technology was needed to meet this high demand and Mortimer Taube delivered. He dabbled in many projects during and after the war. In 1944 he joined the Library of Congress as the Assistant Chief of the General Reference and Bibliographical Division. He was then head of the Science and Technology project from 1947 to 1949. He worked for the Atomic Energy Commission, which was established after "the Manhattan District Project wanted to evaluate and publish the scientific and engineering records showing the advancements made during the war." Their goal was also to make the material more readily available to the public and to open up business with countries abroad. He was Deputy Chief of the Technical Information Service. He also presented on the subject of Information Storage and Retrieval at a Symposium held by the Air Force Office of Scientific Research in 1958 in Washington D.C.

Documentation, Inc.
Mortimer Taube also worked heavily with documentation, the literature pertaining to the new scientific innovation. He was a consultant and Lecturer on Scientific Documentation and was even the editor of American Documentation in the years 1952–1953. In 1952, Taube founded his own company, Documentation, Inc. with Gerald J. Sophar and two others.  Documentation, Inc. was the "largest aerospace information center" and did work for NASA.  Here Taube developed Coordinate Indexing, an important innovation in the field of Library Science. Taube defines Coordinate Indexing as, "the analysis of any field of information into a set of terms and the combination of these terms in any order to achieve any desired degree of detail in either indexing or selection." Coordinate Indexing used "uniterms" to make storing and retrieving information easier and faster.   Uniterms "constitute a special set of rules and requirements which makes both the analysis into terms and the combination of the terms in order to specify items of information a remarkably simple and efficient process." Taube had split coordinate indexing into two categories, item and term indexing.  It used punch cards and a machine reader to search for specific items or documents by terms or keywords.  Documentation, Inc. also brought forth the IBM 9900 Special Index Analyzer, also known as COMAC. COMAC stood for "continuous multiple access controller."  This machine handled data punch cards, used for information storage and retrieval.  It made "logical relationships among terms."  Even though Documentation Inc. started as a small company, it soon grew to well over 700 members.

Personal life
Taube and his wife Bernice had three children together: a son named Donald, and two daughters, Deborah and Susan.

Taube had a variety of interests, including tennis, sailing, music, and collecting paintings.  He was very active, frequently sleeping for only two or three hours a night.  Taube developed an interest in philosophy in his later years and was writing a book on the subject before he died.  While his technology work influenced modern computer cataloguing systems and OPACs, he did not have a high regard for computers, as they "didn't think."

Death 
Taube died suddenly at the age of 54 of a heart attack after sailing on his ship.

Selected works
Computers and Common Sense, the Myth of Thinking Machines. 1961.
Studies in Coordinate Indexing. Washington, D.C.: 1953–1959.
Information Storage and Retrieval: Theory, Systems, and Devices. 1958.

Awards
First recipient of the Distinguished Contributions to Special Librarianship by the SLA-1952.

References

Bibliography
 
 "Mortimer Taube Dies; Founded Data Service", The Washington Post and Times-Herald (1959–1973), September 5, 1965
 
 Smith, Elizabeth S., "On the Shoulder of Giants: from Boole to Shannon to Taube: the Origins of Computerized Information from the Mid-19th Century to the Present," Information Technology and Libraries (1993): http://www.accessmylibrary.com/article-1G1-13188135/shoulders-giants-boole-shannon.html
 Taube, Mortimer, and Associates. Coordinate Indexing. Documentation, Incorporated, 1953
 Taube, Mortimer, and Harold Wooster. Information Storage and Retrieval. New York: Columbia University Press, 1958.

American librarians
1910 births
1965 deaths
University of Chicago alumni
University of California, Berkeley alumni
People from Jersey City, New Jersey
Mills College faculty
Harvard University faculty
Duke University faculty
University of Chicago faculty
Columbia University faculty
Library of Congress
Manhattan Project people